Mary Mary is an American gospel music duo.

Mary Mary (Mary, Mary) may also refer to:

Music 

 Mary Mary (album), a 2005 album by Mary Mary
 "Mary Mary", a song by Velvet Revolver from its Libertad album
 "Mary, Mary" (song), a 1966 song by The Monkees
 "Mary, Mary", a modified cover of The Monkees song by Run-D.M.C. from its Tougher Than Leather album
 "Mary Mary", a song by Bruce Springsteen from his 2014 EP American Beauty
 "Mary, Mary", a song by Chumbawamba from its Tubthumper album
 "Mary, Mary, Quite Contrary", a 1744 nursery rhyme
 Mary Byker (born 1963), English singer also known as Mary Mary

Other media 

 Mary Mary (TV series), an American reality television series starring the gospel duo Mary Mary
 Mary, Mary (film), a 1963 film directed by Mervyn LeRoy; an adaptation of the 1961 play
 Mary, Mary (novel), a 2006 novel by James Patterson
 Mary, Mary (play), a 1961 play by Jean Kerr
 Sergeant Mary Mary, a character in Jasper Fforde's nursery crimes series, introduced in The Big Over Easy (2005)

See also 

 Mary (disambiguation)